Rekreatur is Equilibrium's third full-length album, which was released on 18 June 2010. The band released the music video for "Der Ewige Sieg" on 16 June 2010. On 11 June, the album in its entirety was available for streaming from the band's official MySpace until 18 June.

Track listing

Charts

Personnel
 Robert "Robse" Dahn – lead vocals
 René Berthiaume – guitar/keyboards
 Andreas Völkl – guitar
 Sandra Völkl – bass
 Manuel DiCamillo – drums

In popular culture
 YouTuber MeltingMan234 uses the acoustic version of "Heimwärts" as his intro.

References

2010 albums
Equilibrium (band) albums
Nuclear Blast albums